Brycea disjuncta is a moth of the subfamily Arctiinae. It is found in Mexico, Guatemala and Brazil.

References

Lithosiini